Spanish Fly is a 1975 British-Spanish comedy film directed by Bob Kellett and starring Leslie Phillips, Terry-Thomas, Graham Armitage, Sue Lloyd and Nadiuska.

Plot
Mike Scott, an impotent British fashion designer, heads out to Spain for a photo shoot and encounters an old school rival, Sir Percy de Courcy, who has inadvertently added an aphrodisiac to the local wine.

Cast
 Leslie Phillips as Mike Scott
 Terry-Thomas as Sir Percy de Courcy
 Graham Armitage as Perkins
 Nadiuska as Julie
 Sue Lloyd as Janet Scott
 Frank Thornton as Doctor Johnson
 Ramiro Oliveros as Juan
 Andrea Allan as Bruce
 Sally Farmiloe as Francesca
 Jaleh Haddah as Annette
 Nina Francis as Isabel
 Sergio Mendizábal as Pons Prades  
 Emiliano Redondo as Clean Domingo  
 Fernando Villena as Dirty Domingo  
 Marisa Porcel as Maria  
 José Lifante as Pedro

Production
Impact-Quadrant Films was a company run by Peter James and Kent Walwin which specialised in financing and distributing horror films. They wanted to move into the British domestic sex comedy market, having noticed that there were no challengers to the Carry On Films.  They made a small investment in Can You Keep It Up for a Week? which was successful and they began to look at making a whole feature.

A Canadian distributor had success with a Leslie Phillips film and asked if they could have another. Phillips was about to go to Australia for a year so they had a script written quickly, about an escort agency. Nobody liked it so James and Walwin wrote a 110-page treatment over "a long weekend" which was turned into a script by a writer.

The film's budget was £250,000, of which 40% was provided by EMI Films and a Spanish company 8%. The majority capital was split between James, his associate and four English backers, one of them a lawyer.

The film was part of a six-picture slate from EMI Films, which also included Evil Under the Sun, Aces High and cinema adaptations of The Likely Lads and Sweeney!.

It was filmed in Menorca. Terry-Thomas was suffering from the effects of Parkinson's disease. However, he was still able to withstand the rigours of filming, in what was his last major film role.

Reception
The film was released with a heavy advertising campaign, including a novelisation of the script, a song "Fly Me" (because the BBC would not play a song called "Spanish Fly").

Responses
Barry Norman in The Observer called it the least funny British funny film ever made. Radio Times reviewer Jeremy Aspinall described it as a "curio from the 1970s" which "looks awfully dated now. However, the stars still manage to exhibit consummate charm and professionalism despite the bawdy nonsense going on around them." Time Out refers to it as being a "[d]ire comedy which doubles as a series of plugs for an underwear company." The film featured designs from Peter Reger.

Box-office
Screening rights to the film were sold to 25 countries, something James attributed to the fact that unlike many British sex comedies it featured foreign locations.

James wanted to make a sequel French Kiss but none eventuated.

References

External links

Spanish Fly at VFI

1975 films
Spanish comedy films
Films shot at EMI-Elstree Studios
1975 comedy films
Films directed by Bob Kellett
British comedy films
Films scored by Ron Goodwin
EMI Films films
Films set in London
Films set in Spain
1970s English-language films
1970s British films
English-language Spanish films